Peter Hook and The Light are an English rock band, formed in May 2010 by bass guitarist/vocalist Peter Hook, formerly of the influential post-punk bands Joy Division and New Order. The band also features Hook's son Jack Bates (bass), as well as Andy Poole (keyboards) and Paul Kehoe (drums), who both played with Hook as part of Monaco, one of Hook's previous groups. From the first gigs in May 2010, Nat Wason (formerly of Haven) was the group's guitarist, however in July 2013 he was replaced by David Potts, another former member of Monaco.

The band is noted for performing the Joy Division and New Order albums live. Their setlists primarily feature the two Joy Division albums, Unknown Pleasures and Closer or the first two New Order albums, Movement and Power, Corruption & Lies, depending on the respective tour. The band gained some criticism from the other New Order members, Bernard Sumner and Stephen Morris (also of Joy Division) and Gillian Gilbert, after New Order's reunion without Hook.

The band is also occasionally accompanied by Rowetta, who performs guest vocals.

The band's debut EP, 1102 | 2011 EP, was released on 9 May 2011. It features four Joy Division covers, one of which is a rework of "Pictures In My Mind" which was unreleased at that time.

History

2010: Joy Division Unknown Pleasures tour 
Hook was a founding member of Joy Division (1976-1980), which broke up after the suicide of vocalist Ian Curtis. The surviving members soon formed New Order, with Hook handling lead vocals on a few early songs before Bernard Sumner became the band's primary singer. Both bands enjoyed success: Joy Division posthumously were recognized as an early example of post punk due to their experiments with the genre, and New Order during their career as they fused post-punk with electronic dance music. New Order had several hiatuses due to personal obligations and creative differences. In 2007, Hook stated that he and Sumner were no longer speaking or working together, and in 2009 Sumner announced he no longer wished to make music with New Order. Nonetheless, New Order reunited in 2011 for live performances, without Hook.

2011: Joy Division Closer tour 

Hook and his band began 2011 with more European tour dates, taking in Portugal, France, Spain, Netherlands, Finland and Norway. On 18 & 19 May 2011, one year on from when the band first played Unknown Pleasures live, Peter Hook and The Light performed Joy Division's second album, Closer, live for the first time, again with two sold out nights at Hook's Factory nightclub. The debut Closer shows were followed by more extensive touring, the band visited Brazil for the first time in June 2011 as well as performing at various festivals across Europe. In September 2011, Hook and his band embarked on their second North American tour, this time taking in 9 cities in the USA as well as visiting Canada for the first time to perform in Toronto and Montreal. As in 2010, Hook invited several of his famous friends to join him on stage as guest vocalists. Perry Farrell again joined the band at the Music Box in Los Angeles, this time to sing 'Isolation'. Moby performed a total of 7 songs live with The Light across the two dates in Los Angeles, while Smashing Pumpkins frontman Billy Corgan joined Hook on stage in Chicago to sing 'Transmission' and 'Love Will Tear Us Apart'. Following these dates, The Light played three sold out shows in Mexico, performing in Tijuana, Guadalajara and Mexico City. After these dates, the band took a short break before resuming touring in November with gigs in Israel, Greece, Denmark, Italy and Holland.

2012–2013: Joy Division albums and New Order Movement and Power Corruption & Lies albums tour 
The Light began 2012 by performing Unknown Pleasures & Closer shows live in Luxembourg, Spain, Germany, Slovakia, Poland, Czech Republic, Russia, Finland, Norway, Sweden and Japan as well as back at home in the UK. The Light first performed both Joy Division albums live together in the same night at a special hometown show at the Buxton Opera House on 25 February 2012. The band also played 3 tracks from New Order's first album Movement at this show - a precursor of what would follow in 2013. The band's first proper UK tour took place in May/June 2012, and was followed by a second UK tour in November 2012. The Light also continued to tour in Europe with sold out shows in Belgium, France, Holland, Italy & Portugal.

In January 2013, Hook turned his focus from Joy Division to New Order and performed the first two New Order albums, Movement and Power, Corruption & Lies, live for the first time at 3 special shows in the UK. The band performed an intimate, warm-up show at Clwb Ifor Bach, in Cardiff before then performing two large, sold out shows at KOKO in London and the Manchester Cathedral. The Manchester Cathedral show was later released as a live album by online recording company Play Concert. Following these shows, the band took a short break before resuming their shows performing the Joy Division material in more new places including Slovenia, Croatia, Hungary, Switzerland and Austria as well as with return visits to Poland and Russia. Summer 2013 saw The Light perform at various festivals including EJEKT 2013 in Athens, Greece & the 2013 MIDI Festival in the south of France. On 23 June 2013, Peter Hook and The Light performed both Joy Division albums live in Ian Curtis' hometown of Macclesfield, within the unique surroundings of Christ Church. The Light also performed their Movement and Power, Corruption & Lies set for only the fourth time ever by returning to the Buxton Opera House on 23 July 2013.

September 2013 saw Peter Hook and The Light officially begin their Movement and Power, Corruption & Lies world tour, which spanned both North & South America as well as the UK & Ireland. The band also returned to Greece to follow their 2011 Unknown Pleasures shows by performing Closer live in Athens & Thessaloniki.

2014–2015: Joy Division albums and New Order Low-Life and Brotherhood albums tour 
Following their 2013 tour of Movement and Power, Corruption, and Lies, Peter Hook and the Light embarked on a North American fall tour in 2014, performing the New Order albums "Low-Life" and "Brotherhood"

In February 2015 the band toured Australia and New Zealand playing a 50-minute selection of Joy Division tracks, the New Order albums Low-Life and Brotherhood and some New Order singles.
On 18 May 2015, the band performed a complete retrospective performance of Joy Division's entire catalogue, in chronological order, in Christ Church. This was to mark the 35th anniversary of the death of Joy Division frontman Ian Curtis. The event sold out in minutes.

In June, Jack Bates became the touring bass player for The Smashing Pumpkins for their The End Times Tour.

2016–present: Substance Live, Joy Division Orchestrated, others 
In 2016, the band toured Europe and the UK playing singles mainly from Joy Division's Substance album, and on some tour dates the singles from New Order's Substance album.  Starting in June, the band continued touring in the UK, and then the United States and Canada where they would play both a New Order set and a Joy Division set with tracks from Substance. In December, the band toured South America. The band continued touring in 2017 with gigs in England and Wales, and plans to tour Australia and the United States. In 2017, for Record Store Day, the band released four live albums covering their concert gigs in Dublin, Leeds, and Manchester, where they covered the Joy Division albums Closer and Unknown Pleasures, as well as the New Order albums Movement and Power Corruption & Lies. In 2018, the band continued touring in Australia, Europe, and the US, this time without Jack Bates.

In 2019, the band covered the New Order albums Technique and Republic while touring the UK and North America. On 5 July 2019, the band performed an orchestral rendition of Joy Division songs with the Manchester Camerata at the Royal Albert Hall. Guest vocalists included Natalie Findlay, Mica Miller and Bastien Marshall. In August, they worked with The Metropolitan Orchestra to perform the set in Australia.

On 18 May 2020, the band video-streamed their 2015 Macclesfield performance under the title So This Is Permanent for 24 hours on YouTube. Donations were requested to help the Epilepsy Society, and a DVD would be released in June.

In October 2021, Peter Hook and the Light announced the “Joy Division: A Celebration" tour across the United States and Canada. The tour set for August and September 2022 has 26 tour stops.

Band members
 Peter Hook – lead vocals, bass, guitars, melodica, electronic drums (2010–present)
 Jack Bates – bass, electronic drums, cymbals, cowbell (2010–present)
 Paul Kehoe – drums, keyboards, synthesizers, programming (2010–present)
 David Potts – guitars, backing vocals, keyboards, synthesizers (2013–present)
 Martin Rebelski – keyboards, synthesizers, programming (2017–present)

Former touring members
 Andy Poole – keyboards, backing vocals, synthesizers, programming, vocoder, syn drum (2010–2016)
 Nat Wason – guitars (2010-2013)
 Fred Sablan - bass (2018)
 Yves Altana - bass, guitars, backing vocals (2018–2019)
 Paul Duffy - bass (2022)

Featured guests
 Rowetta – guest vocals

Discography

EPs
 1102 | 2011 EP (2011, Haçienda Records)

Live albums
 Joy Division's Unknown Pleasures – Orchestral Version (2010)
 Peter Hook's The Light Perform "Unknown Pleasures" Live At Goodwood (2010, Abbey Road Live Here Now)
 Unknown Pleasures – Live In Australia (2011, Pylon Records)
 Joy Division's Unknown Pleasures and Closer (Live At Hebden Bridge) (2014)
 New Order's Low Life and Brotherhood (Live At Hebden Bridge) (2014)
 New Order´s Movement and Power Corruption and Lies (Live At Hebden Bridge) (2014)
 So This Is Permanence (2015, Live Here Now)
 Substance: The Albums Of Joy Division and New Order (Live At Apollo Theatre – Manchester 16/06/16) (2016)
 Joy Division's Unknown Pleasures and Closer, New Order's Movement (Live At Roundhouse, Camden) (2017)
 Closer Live Tour 2011 – Live in Manchester (2017)
 Movement Tour 2013 – Live in Dublin (2017)
 Power, Corruption, & Lies Tour 2013 – Live in Dublin (2017)
 Unknown Pleasures Tour 2012 – Live in Leeds (2017)
 New Order's Technique & Republic (Live At Koko, London 28/09/18) (2018)

References

External links

2010 establishments in England
Alternative dance musical groups
English alternative rock groups
English new wave musical groups
English post-punk music groups
English synth-pop groups
Joy Division
Musical groups established in 2010
Musical groups from Manchester
New Order (band)